Mars Exploration Program (MEP) is a long-term effort to explore the planet Mars, funded and led by NASA. Formed in 1993, MEP has made use of orbital spacecraft, landers, and Mars rovers to explore the possibilities of life on Mars, as well as the planet's climate and natural resources. The program is managed by NASA's Science Mission Directorate by Doug McCuistion of the Planetary Science Division. As a result of 40% cuts to NASA's budget for fiscal year 2013, the Mars Program Planning Group (MPPG) was formed to help reformulate the MEP, bringing together leaders of NASA's technology, science, human operations, and science missions.

Governance 
First convening in October 1999, the Mars Exploration Program Analysis Group (MEPAG) enables the scientific community to provide input for the planning and prioritizing of the Mars Exploration Program. Mars exploration missions, as do most NASA missions, can be fairly costly. For example, NASA's Curiosity rover (landed on Mars in Aug 2012) has a budget exceeding $2.5 billion. NASA also has goals of collaborating with the European Space Agency (ESA) in order to conduct a mission involving returning a sample of Mars soil to Earth, which would likely cost at least $5 billion and take ten years to complete.

Objectives 

According to NASA, there are four broad goals of the MEP, all having to do with understanding the potential for life on Mars.

 Determine if life ever arose on Mars – In order to understand Mars' habitability potential, it must be determined whether or not there ever was life on Mars, which begins with assessing the planet's suitability for life. The main strategy regarding the MEP, nicknamed "Follow the Water," is the general idea that where water is present, there is life (at least in instances on Earth). It is likely that if life ever did arise on Mars, there would need to be a supply of water that was present for a substantial amount of time. Therefore, a prominent goal of the MEP is to look for places where water is, was, or could possibly be, such as dried up riverbeds, under the planetary surface, and in Mars' polar ice caps. Aside from water, life also needs sources of energy to survive. The abundance of superoxides makes life on the surface of Mars very unlikely, which essentially rules out sunlight as a possible source of energy for life. Therefore, alternative sources of energy must be searched for, such as geothermal and chemical energy. These sources, which are both used by life forms on Earth, could be used by microscopic life forms living under the Mars' surface. Life on Mars can also be searched for by finding signatures of past and present life or biosignatures. Relative carbon abundance and the location and forms that it can be found in can inform where and how life may have developed. Also, the presence of carbonate minerals, along with the fact that Mars' atmosphere is made up largely of carbon dioxide, would tell scientists that water may have been on the planet long enough to foster the development of life.

 Characterize the climate of Mars – Another goal of the MEP is to characterize both the current and past climate of Mars, as well as factors that influence climate change on Mars. Currently what is known is that the climate is regulated by seasonal changes of Mars' ice caps, movement of dust by the atmosphere, and the exchange of water vapor between the surface and the atmosphere. To understand these climatic phenomena means helping scientists more effectively model Mars' past climate, which brings a higher degree of understanding of the dynamics of Mars.

 Characterize the geology of Mars – The geology of Mars is differentiable from that of Earth by, among other things, its extremely large volcanoes and lack of crust movement. A goal of the MEP is to understand these differences from Earth along with the way that wind, water, volcanoes, tectonics, cratering and other processes have shaped the surface of Mars. Rocks can help scientists describe the sequence of events in Mars' history, tell whether there was an abundance of water on the planet through identifying minerals that are formed only in water, and tell if Mars once had a magnetic field (which would point toward Mars at one point being a dynamic Earth-like planet).

 Prepare for the human exploration of Mars – A human mission to Mars presents a massive engineering challenge. With Mars' surface containing superoxides and lacking a magnetosphere and an ozone layer to protect from radiation from the Sun, scientists would have to thoroughly understand as much of Mars' dynamics as possible before any action can be taken toward the goal of putting humans on Mars.

Challenges 

Mars exploration missions have historically had some of the highest failure rates for NASA missions, which can be attributed to the immense engineering challenges of these missions as well as some bad luck. With many of the goals of the MEP involving entry, descent, and landing of spacecraft (EDL) on the surface of Mars, factors like the planet's atmosphere, uneven surface terrain, and high cost of replicating Mars-like environments for testing come into play.

Compared to the Earth, the atmosphere of Mars is about 100 times thinner. As a result, if a landing craft were to descend into Mars' atmosphere, it would decelerate at a much lower altitude, and depending on the object's mass, may not have enough time to reach terminal velocity. In order to deploy super- or subsonic decelerators, velocity must be below a threshold or they will not be effective. Therefore, technologies must be developed so that a landing craft can be decelerated enough to allow adequate time for other necessary landing processes to be carried out before landing. Mars' atmosphere varies significantly over the course of a Mars year, which prevents engineers from being able to develop a system for EDL common among all missions. Frequently-occurring dust storms increase lower atmospheric temperature and lessen atmospheric density, which, coupled with the extremely variable elevations on Mars' surface, forces a conservative selection of a landing site in order to allow for sufficient craft deceleration. With Mars EDL sequences only lasting about 5–8 minutes, the associated systems must be unquestionably reliable. Ideally, this would be verified by data obtained by carrying out large-scale tests of various components of the EDL systems on Earth-based testing. However, the costs of reproducing environments in which this data would be relevant in terms of Mars' environment are considerably high, resulting in testing being purely ground-based or simulating results of tests involving technologies derived from past missions.

The surface of Mars is extremely uneven, containing rocks, mountainous terrain, and craters. For a landing craft, the ideal landing area would be flat and debris-free. Since this terrain is almost impossible to find on Mars, landing gear must be very stable and have enough ground clearance to prevent problems with tipping over and instability upon landing. In addition, the deceleration systems of these landers would need to include thrusters that are pointed at the ground. These thrusters must be designed so that they only need to be active for an extremely short amount of time; if they are active and pointed at rocky ground for more than a few milliseconds, they start to dig trenches, launch small rocks up into the landing gear, and cause destabilizing backpressure to be forced upon the lander. 

Finding an adequate landing site means being able to estimate rock size from orbit. The technology to accurately determine rock size under 0.5 meters in diameter from orbit has not yet been developed, so instead rock size distribution is inferred from its relationship to thermal inertia, based on thermal response of the landing site measured by satellites currently orbiting Mars. The Mars Reconnaissance Orbiter also helps this cause in the sense that its cameras can see rocks larger than 0.5 m in diameter. Along with the possibility of the lander tipping over on sloped surfaces, large topographical features like hills, mesas, craters and trenches pose the problem of interference with ground sensors. Radar and Doppler radar can falsely measure altitude during descent and the algorithms that target the touchdown point of the lander can be "tricked" into releasing the lander too early or late if the craft passes over mesas or trenches while descending.

History

Background 

While it was observed in ancient times by the Babylonians, Egyptians, Greeks, and others, it was not until the invention of the telescope in the 17th century that Mars was studied in depth. The first attempt at sending a probe to the surface of Mars, nicknamed "Marsnik 1," was by the USSR in 1960. The probe failed to reach Earth orbit, and the mission was ultimately unsuccessful. Failure to complete mission objectives has been common in missions designed to explore Mars; roughly two-thirds of all spacecraft destined for Mars have failed before any observation could begin. The Mars Exploration Program itself was formed officially in the wake of the failed Mars Observer in September 1992, which had been NASA's first Mars mission since the Viking 1 and Viking 2 projects in 1975. The spacecraft, which was based on a modified Earth-orbiting commercial communications satellite (i.e., SES's Astra 1A satellite), carried a payload of instruments designed to study the geology, geophysics, and climate of Mars from orbit. The mission ended in August 1993 when communications were lost three days before the spacecraft had been scheduled to enter orbit.

2000s 
In the 2000s, NASA established the Mars Scout Program as a campaign under the Mars Exploration Program to send a series of small, low-cost robotic missions to Mars, competitively selected from innovative proposals by the scientific community with a budget cap of US$485 million. The first robotic spacecraft in this program was Phoenix, which utilized a lander originally manufactured for the canceled Mars Surveyor 2001 mission. Phoenix was one of four finalists selected out of 25 proposals. The four finalists were Phoenix, MARVEL, SCIM (Sample Collection for Investigation of Mars), and the ARES ("Aerial Regional-scale Environmental Survey") Mars airplane. SCIM was a sample return mission that would have used a free-return trajectory and aerogel to capture Mars dust and return it to Earth (see also: the Stardust mission). MARVEL was an orbiter that would have searched for volcanism as well as analyzed various components of the Mars atmosphere. The name is an acronym for Mars Volcanic Emission and Life Scout, and it was intended to detect gases from life if it was there. ARES was an aircraft concept for Mars to study the lower atmosphere and surface. On September 15, 2008, NASA announced that it had selected MAVEN for the second mission. This mission was budgeted at no more than US$475 million. After only two selections, the NASA Science Directorate announced in 2010 that Mars Scout would be incorporated into the Discovery program, which was re-scoped to allow Mars missions to be proposed. InSight, a Mars seismology and geology mission, was ultimately chosen as the twelfth Discovery program mission.

2010s 
A significant budget cut of US$300 million to NASA's planetary science division occurred in FY2013, which prompted the cancellation of the agency's participation in ESA's ExoMars program, as well as a reevaluation of the Mars Exploration Program as a whole. In February 2012, the Mars Program Planning Group (MPPG) was convened in Washington, D.C. to discuss candidate mission concepts for the 2018 or 2020 launch window, in an initiative known as Mars Next Generation. The purpose of the MPPG was to develop foundations for a program-level architecture for robotic exploration of Mars that is consistent with the Obama administration's challenge of sending humans to Mars orbit in the decade of the 2030s, yet remain responsive to the primary scientific goals of the 2011 NRC Decadal Survey for Planetary Science. The MPPG used non-consensus, individual inputs of both NASA civil servant and contractor employees, with resulting decisions being the exclusive responsibility of NASA. 

The immediate focus of the MPPG was on the collection of multiple mission concept options for the 2018 and 2020 Mars launch window. At a budget envelope of $700 million USD, including a launch vehicle, it was presumed that the mission would be limited to an orbiter. Near-term ideas were taken into consideration for early mission planning in the 2018-2024 timeframe, while mid- to longer-term ideas informed program-level architecture planning for 2026 and beyond. Strategies explored for such a mission included a sample-return mission where soil samples are placed in Mars orbit in the late 2020s or early 2030s, an in-situ soil analysis, and a study of Mars' surface and deep interior preceding a sample-return mission and/or crewed mission. Concept missions that were studied that fit the budget requirement of US$700 million to US$800 million included the Next Mars Orbiter (NeMO) to replace aging satellites' telecommunication services, and a stationary lander to investigate and select samples suitable for a later return to Earth. Prior to the findings of the MPPG, the House Appropriations Committee's Commerce-Justice-Science subcommittee approved a budget in April 2012 that reinstated US$150 million to the Planetary Science budget, with a caveat that a sample-return mission be mandated. The MPPG's final report was drafted in August 2012 and published in September.  Ultimately endorsing a sample-return mission, the recommendation influenced NASA's FY2014 budget process.

Missions

List

Timeline

See also 

 Exploration of Mars
 List of missions to Mars
 List of NASA missions

References 
Notes

Citations

External links 
 Mars Exploration Program at the Jet Propulsion Laboratory
 Mars Exploration Program Analysis Group (MEPAG) at the Jet Propulsion Laboratory

 
Exploration of Mars
NASA programs